Jeanne Willis (born St Albans, England) is an author of several children's books, including The Monster Bed (1986), the Dr. Xargle's Book of... series (1988–2004), and Shamanka (2007). Willis was also a contributor to the authorised Winnie-the-Pooh sequel, The Best Bear in All the World.  Willis lives in London, England, with her husband and two children.

Awards
Red House Children's Book Award 2007 - Who's In The Loo?
The Red House and Sheffield Children's Book Awards 2007 - Who's In The Loo?
Silver Smarties Prize 2003 (0–5 years category) - Tadpole's Promise
,,In Search of the Hidden Giant" is one of her best books, with exquisite narrative and mystery.

References

External links

Author's Website

Bibliography
Author Profile
Jeanne Willis at Andersen Press

English children's writers
Year of birth missing (living people)
Living people